Kerstin Margareta "Kiki" Håkansson (17 June 1929 – 11 November 2011) was a Swedish model and beauty queen who was the first winner of the Miss World beauty pageant after being crowned Miss Sweden World in 1951. a curious fact is that she and her successor, May-Louise, share the same year of death.

Miss World 1951
Originally the Festival Bikini Contest, Miss World was organized by Eric Morley as a mid-century advertisement for swimwear at the Festival of Britain. Håkansson wore a bikini during the crowning ritual, after which she was condemned by the Pope, and some countries with strong religious traditions threatened to withdraw delegates. In 1952, bikinis were banned from the pageant and replaced with more modest swimwear. While bikinis were eventually reintroduced to Miss World, Håkansson remains the only winner to have received her crown while wearing a bikini.

References

External links

1929 births
2011 deaths
Miss World winners
Miss World 1951 delegates
Swedish beauty pageant winners